Deidre Freeman (born August 26, 1988) is an American diver. The daughter of Will Freeman, a pole-vaulter, Freeman was born in Grinnell, Iowa, and began diving when she was 14. At high school she was a state runner-up as a senior, and placed fourth as a junior. She was a three-time conference champion, All-State, All-District, All-Conference, and team MVP, setting Grinnell High School's 6-dive record and ranking third in Iowa high school history for an 11-dive score. Having studied at the University of Iowa, where she was a two-time All-American performer, The 2013 U.S. national champion on the 3m board, Freeman earned her place in the World Diving Championships by taking second place on 1 Meter and first place on 3 Meter at the 2013 USA Diving World Championships Trials,.

She has competed in 9 US national events and participated in the 2012 US Olympic Trials, taking 4th in the synchronized event and 18th in the 3-meter event. The same year, she was the United States' synchronized representative at the Canada Cup. She currently coaches at Grinnell College.

References

American female divers
Living people
1988 births
Grinnell Pioneers
Sportspeople from Iowa
University of Iowa alumni
Pan American Games medalists in diving
Pan American Games bronze medalists for the United States
Divers at the 2015 Pan American Games
Medalists at the 2015 Pan American Games
21st-century American women